Richard Leighton Levinson (August 7, 1934 – March 12, 1987) was an American screenwriter and producer who often worked in collaboration with William Link.

Life and career
Levinson was born in Philadelphia, Pennsylvania. He attended the University of Pennsylvania, where he earned a Bachelor's Degree in Economics in 1956. He served in the United States Army from 1957 to 1958 and married actress Rosanna Huffman in 1969. Levinson was of Jewish heritage.

William Link and Richard Levinson began a 43-year-long friendship in 1946, on their first day of junior high school. Both were avid Ellery Queen fans from boyhood and enjoyed mental puzzles and challenges, a characteristic that would spill over into their work.

Beginning with radio scripts, the team wrote plays and then prime-time TV scripts. In 1965, they wrote three episodes of Honey West (TV series) including the final episode. They went on to co-create and sometimes produce the detective television series Columbo, Mannix, Ellery Queen, Murder, She Wrote (with Peter S. Fischer) and Scene of the Crime, as well as made-for-TV movies The Gun, My Sweet Charlie, That Certain Summer, The Judge and Jake Wyler, The Execution of Private Slovik, Charlie Cobb: A Nice Night for a Hanging, Rehearsal for Murder, Guilty Conscience, and the short-lived TV series Blacke's Magic. The team were proud of creating "intelligent" rather than violent programs.

The partners also collaborated on two feature films, The Hindenburg (1975) and Rollercoaster (1977), and the Broadway show Merlin, featuring the magician Doug Henning.

The team occasionally used the pseudonym Ted Leighton, most notably on the telefilm Ellery Queen: Don't Look Behind You, (where their work was substantially rewritten by other screenwriters), and Columbo when they came up with stories to be scripted by their collaborators. They used the name as early as 1959 for short stories published in Alfred Hitchcock's Mystery Magazine when the magazine already contained stories appearing as by Levinson and Link. They also used the name for their contribution to the script for Steve McQueen's final movie, The Hunter. Leighton was Levinson's middle name.

In 1979, Levinson and Link received a Special Edgar Award from the Mystery Writers of America for their work on Ellery Queen and Columbo. During the 1980s, they were three-time winners of the Edgar for Best TV Feature or MiniSeries Teleplay, and in 1989 they were given the MWA's Ellery Queen Award, which honors outstanding mystery-writing teams. In November 1995, they were jointly elected to the Television Academy Hall of Fame.

Death
Levinson died of a heart attack at his home in Brentwood, Los Angeles early on March 12, 1987. He was interred at Westwood Village Memorial Park Cemetery. The first Murder, She Wrote spin-off novel, Gin and Daggers, is dedicated to his memory.

In tribute to Levinson, Link wrote the script for the 1991 TV film The Boys, starring James Woods and John Lithgow.

References

External links
 
 

1934 births
1987 deaths
20th-century American businesspeople
20th-century American male writers
20th-century American novelists
American crime fiction writers
American film producers
American male novelists
American male screenwriters
American male television writers
American television writers
Burials at Westwood Village Memorial Park Cemetery
Columbo
Edgar Award winners
Novelists from Pennsylvania
People from Cheltenham, Pennsylvania
Television producers from Pennsylvania
Writers from Philadelphia
20th-century American screenwriters